, son of Matsunaga Nagayori, was a Japanese samurai and lord of Yagi Castle. Earlier called, he was baptised into the Catholic Church in 1564 and took the name Joan (from Portuguese João). He was the brother of a famous woman catechist, Naitō Julia. Following the shogunate’s anti-Christian edict of 1614 he was banished to Manila and died there in 1626.

References

Samurai
Year of birth missing
Japanese Roman Catholics
1626 deaths
Naitō clan
Matsunaga clan
Japanese expatriates in the Philippines